Steven Nkemboanza Mike Christopher Nzonzi (born 15 December 1988) is a French professional footballer who plays as a defensive midfielder for Qatar Stars League club Al-Rayyan. 

Nzonzi began his career with Ligue 2 side Amiens, impressing enough to earn a move to Premier League side Blackburn Rovers in 2009 for £650,000. He spent three years at Ewood Park which ended with Rovers being relegated at the end of the 2011–12 season. He remained in the Premier League however, joining Stoke City for £3 million. At Stoke, Nzonzi established himself as a key member of the squad under Tony Pulis and then under Mark Hughes, where his performances during the 2014–15 earned him the Player of the Year award. He joined Spanish side Sevilla for a fee of £7 million in July 2015, and won the UEFA Europa League in his first season. Nzonzi joined Italian club Roma in 2018, where he played a season before being loaned to Galatasaray in Turkey and Rennes in France the following two seasons. In 2021, he signed for Qatari side Al-Rayyan.

Nzonzi represented France at under-21 level. He turned down the chance to represent his ancestral DR Congo at senior international level, and was unsuccessful in his attempt to become eligible to play for England. In November 2017, he made his debut for the senior France squad, and he was part of their team that won the 2018 FIFA World Cup.

Club career

Early career
Born in La Garenne-Colombes, France, to a Congolese father and French mother, he began his career playing for hometown club Racing Paris. In 1999, he joined the youth system of Paris Saint-Germain playing at the Camp des Loges, the club's youth academy. While at Paris Saint-Germain, Nzonzi, due to his height, was initially installed in the club's academy as a striker and then as an attacking midfielder. After a three-year stint at the Ligue 1 club, he moved to the Basse-Normandie region joining CA Lisieux. He later had one-year stints at both SM Caen and AS Beauvais Oise before finally settling in with Amiens SC in 2005.

Amiens
After featuring in the Championnat de France amateur 2 for his first two years at the club, Nzonzi made his professional debut on 24 November 2007 in a Coupe de France match against amateur club AS Raismes appearing as a substitute in the 74th minute, Amiens won the match 7–0. He earned his first start on 15 April 2008 playing the entire 90 minutes in a 1–0 loss to Bastia. Following the season, he signed his first professional contract and was officially promoted to the senior team.

Nzonzi was given the starting defensive midfielder role for the 2008–09 season and appeared in 36 total matches. He also scored his first professional goal in a 2–1 defeat to Strasbourg on 8 May 2009. The defeat to Strasbourg led to Amiens going winless in their final four matches, which led to the club suffering relegation to the Championnat National, France's third division of football. Despite the relegation, Nzonzi was applauded for his play and he was linked with a move to the English Premier League, with Blackburn Rovers and Portsmouth showing a serious interest in the young Frenchman, who many hailed as the next Patrick Vieira.

Blackburn Rovers
On 28 June 2009, it was reported that Blackburn Rovers had agreed a deal with Amiens to sign Nzonzi. The move was completed on 30 June, signing for a fee of £650,000, on a four-year contract.

On 15 August 2009, Nzonzi made his debut for Blackburn where he made his first start in a 2–0 loss against Manchester City and since making his debut, found himself very much part of Sam Allardyce's plans. He scored his first goal for Rovers on 4 October 2009 against Arsenal in the 6–2 defeat. After scoring his first goal, Nzonzi admitted he had been surprised at how quickly he had established himself in the side but was determined to keep his place in the starting XI. His second goal for the club was a 30-yard strike against Everton on 17 April 2010 in a 3–2 defeat at Ewood Park. On 3 May 2010, during the pre-match build up to the Arsenal game, he was announced as the Blackburn Rovers Player of the Year for the 2009–10 season, chosen by the fans.

In August 2010, Nzonzi signed a new five-year deal with Blackburn, lasting until summer 2015. Rovers chairman John Williams said: "We are delighted to secure Steven for the long term. He was outstanding last year and the new deal is richly deserved." On 21 August 2011, Nzonzi scored his third goal for Blackburn with a header against Birmingham City in a 2–1 defeat at St Andrew's. Soon after Nzonzi found himself dropping down the pecking order as a result of both Phil Jones and Vince Grella's form in midfield. This led Allardyce urged him to raise his game and recapture his form of last season. Later on in his second season, Allardyce was sacked and replaced by Steve Kean. On 2 April 2011, Nzonzi received his first red card of his career in a 0–0 draw against Arsenal two-footed challenge on Laurent Koscielny. Nzonzi was banned for 4 matches and on 30 April 2011, Nzonzi made his return in a 1–0 win over Bolton Wanderers.

On 26 November 2011 against Stoke City, Nzonzi was hit with a violent conduct charge for intentionally elbowing Ryan Shawcross in the face. Nzonzi served a three-match ban after admitting an FA charge of violent conduct. On 11 February 2012, Nzonzi scored his first goal of the season and set up a goal for the club top scorer Yakubu in a 3–2 win over Queens Park Rangers. On 24 March 2012, Nzonzi scored his second goal of the season in a 2–1 loss against Bolton Wanderers. At the end of the season, Blackburn were relegated for the first time in 11 seasons and Nzonzi told manager Steve Kean he wanted to leave.

Stoke City

On 31 August 2012, Nzonzi joined Stoke City for a fee of £3 million.  He made his debut for Stoke in a 1–1 draw at home to Manchester City on 15 September 2012 and his performance earned him the man of the match award. Impressed with Nzonzi's start to his Stoke career manager Tony Pulis believes that he will one day play in the Champions League. Nzonzi was sent off for a "studs-up" challenge on Jack Cork in a 3–3 draw with Southampton on 29 December 2012. However no contact was made with Cork and Pulis decided to appeal Mark Clattenburg's decision. His red card was later rescinded by the FA. After reacting angrily to suffering a broken nose against Fulham, Nzonzi was told to keep his temperament in check by assistant manager David Kemp. He scored his first goal for Stoke in a 2–1 defeat against Tottenham Hotspur on 12 May 2013. He ended the 2012–13 season having made 38 appearances for the club but once the campaign had come to an end he revealed that he was unhappy at the club and handed in a transfer request. His request was rejected by the club.

Under new manager Mark Hughes, Nzonzi remained at Stoke going into the 2013–14 and he produced a man of the match performance against West Ham United on 31 August 2013. However, after this his performances dropped off and assistant manager Mark Bowen advised Nzonzi to stop his 'theatrical sulks'. On 23 November 2013 he scored and provided an assist in a 2–0 win over Sunderland. He was sent-off in the return fixture against Sunderland on 29 January 2014. After serving his suspension Nzonzi spent time on the bench much to his frustration. He returned to the starting line-up and scored in a 4–1 win over Aston Villa on 23 March 2014. He played 40 times for Stoke in 2013–14 as the team finished in 9th position and Nzonzi stated that he is happy playing for Stoke under Mark Hughes. However he handed in a transfer request for a second season running. A move away from Stoke in the summer transfer window did not materialise, despite this Nzonzi insisted he is happy to carry on playing for Stoke.

Nzonzi was an ever-present in 2014–15, playing 42 times as Stoke finished in ninth position for a second consecutive campaign. He also scored a career best of four goals which were against Southampton, Manchester United, Tottenham Hotspur and in a 6–1 victory over Liverpool on the final day of the season. Nzonzi's performances during the campaign earned him the Player of the Year award. In June 2015, with Nzonzi entering his final year on his contract, manager Mark Hughes tried to convince him to agree to sign a new contract. However his efforts were unsuccessful and the club 'reluctantly' accepted a £7 million offer from Sevilla. In total Nzonzi spent three seasons at Stoke making 120 appearances scoring seven goals.

Sevilla

On 9 July 2015, Nzonzi signed for Sevilla for a fee around the region of £7 million, on a four-year contract which includes a €30 million (£21.5m) buyout clause. On 22 August, he was sent off on his debut in a goalless draw at Málaga CF.

Nzonzi initially struggled with the immense heat in Andalusia, and a style of play based on retention of the ball and technical ability, but entered a period of good form in the second half of the season, culminating in Sevilla winning the UEFA Europa League final against Liverpool in Basel.

On 23 October 2016, his winning goal in a home victory over Atlético Madrid put his team briefly on top of the league. He was voted La Liga Player of the Month for January 2017, with the league's website writing "Often to be found in the thick of the action, Nzonzi showcased his aptitude for regaining possession and distributing the play, qualities which have seen him establish himself as one of the first names on Sampaoli's team sheet". On 14 March in the second leg of the last 16 of the Champions League, he had a penalty saved by Leicester City's Kasper Schmeichel – as did teammate Joaquín Correa in the first leg – as Sevilla was eliminated 3–2 on aggregate.

Roma
On 14 August 2018, Nzonzi signed for Serie A club Roma for an initial fee of €26.65 million, plus performance-related clauses that could be worth an additional €4 million. He signed a four-year contract. He made his debut 13 days later in a 3–3 home draw with Atalanta, as a half-time substitute for Bryan Cristante with the team 3–1 down. ESPN FC's analysis named him as man of the match for "adding weight and muscle" to Roma's midfield. On 6 October, he scored his first goal for the Giallorossi, a header in a 2–0 victory at Empoli.

Galatasaray (loan)
On 16 August 2019, Nzonzi was loaned to Turkish side Galatasaray for the 2019–20 season.

Rennes (loan)
On 31 January 2020, Nzonzi was loaned to Rennes.

Al-Rayyan
On 29 September 2021, Qatari club Al-Rayyan confirmed signing of Nzonzi on a two-year contract.

International career
Nzonzi earned his first call up to the France U-21 team by coach Erick Mombaerts on 1 October 2009 for their European Under-21 Championship qualification matches against Malta and Belgium. He made his debut eight days later in the first match, appearing as a 58th-minute substitute for Younousse Sankharé in a 2–0 victory. He earned his first under-21 international start in the match against Belgium, which ended 0–0.

In January 2011, he was called up to the DR Congo national team due to his origins but he did not want to commit to the international team due to structural problems at the administrative level. He did not rule out playing for the Congolese national team in the future. He again turned DR Congo down in November 2012.

In August 2016, Nzonzi's father contacted new England manager Sam Allardyce – who had signed him for Blackburn in 2009 – to inquire whether he was eligible to represent England. Although he had completed more than the five years' necessary residency in the United Kingdom, Nzonzi was ineligible to switch allegiance as he was not eligible for England when he made his debut for France under-21.

On 2 November 2017, Nzonzi was called up to the French senior national team for the first time, for friendly matches against Germany and Wales. He made his debut against the Welsh in a 2–0 win at the Stade de France on 10 November, as a half-time substitute for Corentin Tolisso.

Nzonzi was part of France's squad that won the 2018 FIFA World Cup in Russia. In the final, he came on as a substitute for the booked N'Golo Kanté after 55 minutes of a 4–2 win over Croatia at the Luzhniki Stadium.

Style of play
Nzonzi plays in a defensive role in centre midfield and is noted for being calm and composed whilst in possession and having a good passing ability. He has earned comparisons to compatriot Patrick Vieira both in style and physical ability. He is also able to cover great distance during a match.

Personal life
In September 2013, Nzonzi was interviewed by police after he was involved in a collision with a cyclist in Hale, Greater Manchester. In October 2015, Nzonzi was ordered to stand trial after allegedly assaulting his wife. He was cleared of the charges in December 2015.

Nzonzi has previously commented on the common misstyling of his name as Steven N'Zonzi.

Career statistics

Club

International

Honours
Sevilla
 UEFA Europa League: 2015–16

France
 FIFA World Cup: 2018

Individual
Blackburn Rovers Player of the Year: 2009–10
Stoke City Player of the Year: 2014–15
 UEFA Europa League Squad of the Season: 2015–16
 La Liga Player of the Month: January 2017

Orders
 Knight of the Legion of Honour: 2018

References

External links

1988 births
Living people
People from La Garenne-Colombes
Footballers from Hauts-de-Seine
Association football midfielders
French footballers
French sportspeople of Democratic Republic of the Congo descent
Racing Club de France Football players
Paris Saint-Germain F.C. players
Stade Malherbe Caen players
AS Beauvais Oise players
Amiens SC players
Blackburn Rovers F.C. players
Stoke City F.C. players
Sevilla FC players
A.S. Roma players
Galatasaray S.K. footballers
Stade Rennais F.C. players
Al-Rayyan SC players
Premier League players
Ligue 1 players
Ligue 2 players
La Liga players
Serie A players
Süper Lig players
Qatar Stars League players
Expatriate footballers in England
Expatriate footballers in Spain
Expatriate footballers in Italy
Expatriate footballers in Turkey
Expatriate footballers in Qatar
French expatriate footballers
France under-21 international footballers
France international footballers
French expatriate sportspeople in England
French expatriate sportspeople in Spain
French expatriate sportspeople in Italy
French expatriate sportspeople in Turkey
French expatriate sportspeople in Qatar
UEFA Europa League winning players
People acquitted of assault
2018 FIFA World Cup players
FIFA World Cup-winning players
Black French sportspeople
Chevaliers of the Légion d'honneur